Overland is a 2020 documentary film about falconry, directed and written by Elisabeth Haviland James and Revere La Noue. Overland follows the life of three different persons that share their passion for falconry: Giovanni Granati, a divorced father living in a farmhouse in Abruzzo; anthropologist Lauren McGough from Oklahoma, who spent two years with Khazak nomads in western Mongolia; and an employee of the Crown Prince of Dubai, Khalifa Bin Mujren, who breeds some of the fastest falcons in the world. The documentary took five years to produce and was filmed on four continents.

Overland won the 2020 International Wildlife Film Festival and has been part of the official selection on the Santa Barbara International Film Festival, the Chagrin Documentary Film Fest, the Breck Film Festival, among other events.

References 

2020 films
2020 documentary films
Documentary films about birds
Falconry
American documentary films
2020s American films